Tambaram division is a revenue division in the Chengalpet district of Tamil Nadu, India. It comprises taluks of Pallavaram, Tambaram and Vandalur.

References
 

Kanchipuram district